Ichtegem is a municipality located in the Belgian province of West Flanders 15 km southwest of Bruges. The municipality comprises the towns of Bekegem, Eernegem and Ichtegem proper. On January 1, 2006 Ichtegem had a total population of 13,423. The total area is 45.33 km² which gives a population density of 296 inhabitants per km². The current mayor is Karl Bonny.

In 2006, Ichtegem was declared the official Dorp van de Ronde (Town of the Tour) for the 90th annual road cycling race the Tour of Flanders.

Ichtegem also gained a bit of notoriety when on November 20, 1990, a man was stabbed to death during a concert of American progressive metal band Queensrÿche at the local sports hall Keiberg.

References

External links

Official website - Available only in Dutch

 
Municipalities of West Flanders